Hanjiayuan is a town of Huma County, Da Hinggan Ling Prefecture, in the far north of Heilongjiang province, China. , it has 5 villages under its administration.

See also
List of township-level divisions of Heilongjiang

References

Township-level divisions of Heilongjiang